Linda Pagli (born 1950) is an Italian computer scientist specializing in computer networks and distributed algorithms. She is a professor at the University of Pisa, and a Fellow of the Italian Academy for Advanced Studies in America. She has also worked with UNESCO and the Italian Ministry of Foreign Affairs to help spread expertise in computer science to developing countries.

Education and career
Pagli was born in Livorno, and earned a laurea from the University of Pisa in 1973. She remained at Pisa as a researcher until 1987, when she obtained a full professorship at the University of Salerno, and returned to Pisa as a professor in 1990.

Books
Pagli is the author of the text Mathematical and Algorithmic Foundations of the Internet (with Fabrizio Luccio and Graham Steel, CRC Press, 2011). She is also the author of several Italian-language books, including:
Reti logiche e calcolatore (with Luccio, Bollati Boringhieri, 1991)
Storia matematica della rete: dagli antichi codici all'era di internet (Mathematical history of the network: from the ancient codes to the Internet age, with Luccio, Bollati Boringhieri, 2007)
Algoritmi, divinità e gente comune (with Luccio, ETS, 2012)
Problemi, algoritmi e coding. Le magie dell'informatica (with Pierluigi Crescenzi, Zanichelli, 2017).

References

External links
Home page

1950 births
Living people
Italian computer scientists
Italian women computer scientists
University of Pisa alumni
Academic staff of the University of Salerno
Academic staff of the University of Pisa